It's Geek 2 Me is a tech cartoon about people and their off-center relationships with technology created by Pittsburgh-based cartoonist, Francis Cleetus. He was inspired to draw the very first cartoon by a frantic intern who rushed into his office and asked where the any key was on a computer keyboard. The cartoon evolved into a series when Cleetus worked as a creative director at J. Walter Thompson, Hong Kong on the Hewlett Packard brand.

Cleetus chose Pittsburgh  as the location for the cartoon's imaginary setting 'Paradox Software Corporation' because it has a large tech community, over 1,600 tech-based companies and the Carnegie Institute of Technology, which is ranked among the top five engineering colleges in the country by the U.S. News & World Report.

The first compilation of It's Geek 2 Me cartoons was self-published by the author in 2012 as a paperback titled Wish Your Mouth Had A Backspace Key in the United States via Amazon.com. In 2013, a second compilation titled Total Timepass Tech Toons was published by Hachette India for the Indian subcontinent.

Characters 

The diverse and colorful characters who star in the cartoon were inspired by real people that Cleetus worked with during his professional stints in India, Hong Kong and the US.

Loginder Singh:
Lanky Sikh from Vancouver, Canada, currently lives in a badly-lit cubicle at work. Talented Systems Analyst who's occasionally fixated with complexity. Enjoys flaunting his collection of designer turbans and matching sweatshirts. Eligible bachelor who’s fond of exotic wines and nightly hacking binges. He’s been in an on-and-off relationship with his coworker Emily for three years.

Emily Facebrook:
Charming Office Manager who was the captain of the cheerleading team at her high school in Nashville, TN. She speaks with a soft Southern drawl that is almost as drawn out as her daily to-do list. Never forgets to send herself a stuffed animal on Administrative Professionals' Day. Her love life is a roller coaster where the brakes wore out years ago. She just loves Loginder’s Indo-Canadian accent.

Bill Googli:
Flamboyant Marketing Director of Paradox Software, known for his chic business wardrobe. Born and raised in New Orleans, LA, by mixed parents (African-American and French), Bill grew up around a family bar and restaurant. He has been popular with the ladies since he was featured on Food network for his Creole Margaritas. Designs and builds robotic reptiles to impress coworker Mona.

Spam Murphy:
Cheap Executive Officer as well as Chairman of Paradox Software. He fondly refers to his staff as 'humanware' and treats them like secondhand hardware. He's a seasoned Los Angeles born venture capitalist whose capital flow dried up along with his libido. He’s also a founding board member of the dubious São Paulo based wildlife charity, the James E. Williamson Iguana Fund.

Linux Cooper:
The company's Top Bean Counter or CFO who's dedicated to reducing payroll while increasing his annual bonus. Joined the company as an independent financial analyst and gnawed his way in. A CPA (Compulsive Puzzle Addict), he holds a master's degree in the history of tavern puzzles. The Securities and Exchange Commission has investigated him since he owned a pawnshop as a teen in Phoenix, Arizona.

Mona Dos:
Quality Assurance Director and unofficial water-cooler gossip chief at Paradox Software. She’s a divorced single mother of a 10-year-old named Rio who likes to hang around her office on weekends. Is passionate about her son and the blood-red tulips in her backyard. She moved to Dallas, TX, from Kolkata, India, after a grand but ill-fated marriage to her school sweetheart, a narcissistic urologist.

Icon Murphy:
Spam Murphy's son, New Business Director and heir apparent to the throne at Paradox Software. Holds a PhD on the hazards of texting with ancient Greek symbols while driving, from the University of Cyprus. He’s fluent in six languages including Mandarin, Tagalog and Prolog. Likes to spend weekends taking his single-engine Cessna for a spin. Hopes to turn Paradox into a Fortune 500 company.

Ram Patel:
Father figure to all IT professionals of foreign origin at Paradox Software. Sports a bristly white beard to compensate for the lack of hair on top. Mastered technology when a personal computer filled an entire room. He heads the Maintenance Division at the company and the ‘Courtesy Flush’ poker team in the suburb where he lives with his art museum curator wife and Dalmatian Coco.

Irfan Linkudin:
Vice President - Tech Support at Paradox Software and technically head of the division. Technically, because nobody reports to him. He grew up in Istanbul, Turkey, and moved to Buffalo, New York in the 1960s. His wife of 16 years left him after the dotcom company he founded went bust in 2002. He can single-handedly reassemble the V-turn engine of his Harley-Davidson bike from scratch in under 30 minutes.

Cad Myers:
Corporate Security Director in charge of real and virtual security at Paradox Software. A former Major of the US Army's Field Intelligence Unit, he’s experienced in Hacker Interception and Electrocution. Lost his left pinky on active duty as an intelligence officer during Operation Desert Com in 2001. He oversaw the implementation and management of all the security at the gold mines on Mindanao Island in the Philippines.

Benny Lan:
Sr. Programmer who picked up his cackle, chopsticks and COBOL at a tender age in Wan Chai, Hong Kong. Has a wry sense of humor that's reflected in the random bug he leaves behind in software. He can survive for months on a staple diet of Chinese takeout, Japanese toys and American music. Received a complimentary life membership from Workaholics Anonymous.

Robert Cobolobo:
Human Resources Director, stationery watchdog, and annual holiday program organizer, all rolled into a small South American frame. Found himself in the US after a nubile Texan student succumbed to his charms in Cancun, Mexico. He worked as a Floor-hand in an oil field until he got his MBA in HR Management and worked his way into the lofty corridors of corporate power at Paradox.

Tweetsie Williams:
Management Trainee who thrives on gadgets and technology. She likes to flaunt her master's degree from Virginia Tech and her tough upbringing in Brooklyn, NY. Is the only daughter of a Vietnam veteran who was awarded a Medal of Honor. Her paycheck’s disproportionate to her experience and is solely based on her future potential. She'd give anything, including her blinged out laptop, for a date with Icon.

Rio Dos:
Mona’s 10-year-old son and unpaid tech support guy to all new hires at Paradox Software. He currently holds 14 world records for Desert Commander and is two grades ahead of his classmates in every subject except civics. In addition to English, Spanish and Bengali, he’s also fluent in colloquial Hindi, thanks to the bi-weekly dose of Bollywood films his mom rents from the local Indian grocery store.

Compilations
 Total Timepass Tech Toons (August 2013, Hachette India)
 Wish Your Mouth Had a Backspace Key (October 2012, Amazon.com)

References

External links 
It’s Geek 2 Me homepage
It’s Geek 2 Me on Facebook facebook.com
It’s Geek 2 Me on Twitter twitter.com
It’s Geek 2 Me on Pinterest pinterest.com
It's Geek 2 Me video channel youtube.com

2013 in comics
Comics anthologies
Computer humor
Indian American
Comic strips set in the United States
American comics